South Talwood is a rural locality in the Goondiwindi Region, Queensland, Australia. It is on the border of Queensland and New South Wales.

Geography 
The locality is mostly bounded to the north by the South-Western railway line which enters the locality from the north-east (Bungunya) and exits to the west (Daymar) and by the New South Wales border to the south.

There are two railway stations within South Talwood on the South-Western railway line:

 Gradule railway station
 Lalaguli railway station (now abandoned )
The land use is a mix of dry and irrigated cropping as well as grazing on native vegetation.

History 
Maraweka Provisional School opened on 16 July 1922 as  half-time provisional school (meaning a single teacher was shared between the two schools) in conjunction with Noralvera Provisional School which opened on 24 July 1922. Both schools were closed by early 1926.

Education 
There are no schools in South Talwood. The nearest primary schools are Talwood State School in neighbouring North Talwood to the north and Thallon State School in Thallon to the west. The nearest secondary schools are some distance away: St George State High School in St George to the north-west and Goondiwindi State High School in Goondiwindi to the east. Distance education and boarding schools would be other options.

References 

Goondiwindi Region
Localities in Queensland